Alice Kust Harding is an American astrophysicist at the NASA Goddard Space Flight Center, Greenbelt, Maryland.

Early life and education 
Harding earned a B.A. from Bryn Mawr College, Pennsylvania,  in 1973, and a Ph.D. from the University of Massachusetts-Amherst, in 1979.

Career and research 
In 1980, Harding was appointed as astrophysicist in the Astrophysics Science Division at Goddard Space Flight Center, a post she has held since then. Her main research interests have been high-energy particle acceleration and radiation processes in pulsars, highly magnetized neutron stars (magnetars), gamma-ray bursts, and supernova remnants.

Harding works as part of astrophysics collaborations including the NICER Science Team, the Fermi Collaboration and AMEGO.

Awards and honours 
Harding was awarded the status of Fellow in the American Physical Society, after being nominated by their Division of Astrophysics  in 1991, for pioneering investigation of the theory of pulsar atmospheres, including the pulsar wind and its role in accelerating particles to high energies, and for contributions to the theory of basic electromagnetic interactions in the presence of super-strong magnetic fields.

In 1994, Harding received a NASA Exceptional Scientific Achievement Medal in 1994. In 2012, she was awarded the John C. Lindsay Memorial Award in recognition of her scientific achievements at Goddard.

Harding was awarded the 2013 Bruno Rossi Prize together with Roger W. Romani for establishing a theoretical framework for understanding gamma-ray pulsars.
She was elected a Legacy Fellow of the American Astronomical Society in 2020.

References

Year of birth missing (living people)
Living people
20th-century American physicists
20th-century American women scientists
American women physicists
Fellows of the American Astronomical Society
Fellows of the American Physical Society
21st-century American physicists
21st-century American women scientists